North Durham County Prison Camp, also known as Durham County Tuberculosis Sanatorium, is a historic prison and sanatorium located at Durham, Durham County, North Carolina. It was built in 1925, and is a three-story, "T"-shaped, Italianate style brick building.  The building measures 232 feet long and has 17,000 square feet of floorspace.  It features a three bay, Tuscan order portico in the Colonial Revival style. The building was originally constructed to serve as a prison facility.  It housed a prison between 1925 and 1938, was converted for use as a tuberculosis sanatorium beginning in 1944 and continued this function until 1953.  It then housed WTVD Television Corporation until 1979.

It was listed on the National Register of Historic Places in 1998.

References

Prisons in North Carolina
Government buildings on the National Register of Historic Places in North Carolina
Italianate architecture in North Carolina
Colonial Revival architecture in North Carolina
Government buildings completed in 1925
Buildings and structures in Durham, North Carolina
National Register of Historic Places in Durham County, North Carolina
1925 establishments in North Carolina